Multimedios Radio is the radio division of Grupo Multimedios, operating 31 radio stations in northern and central Mexico.

Multimedios traces its history to the founding of XEAW-AM in the late 1930s.

Stations

Monterrey, Nuevo León 
Multimedios owns 14 stations in its home city of Monterrey:

 XENL-AM 860 "Radio Recuerdo" (romantic)
 XET-AM 990 "La T Grande de Monterrey" (talk)
 XEAU-AM 1090 "Milenio Radio" (Milenio Televisión audio)
 XETKR-AM 1480 "TKR 1480" (ranchera)
 XHERG-FM 92.9 / XERG-AM 690 "La Deportiva" (sports)
 XET-FM 94.1 "La Caliente" (grupera)
 XHJD-FM 98.9 "D99" (pop)
 XHAW-FM 101.3 / XEAW-AM 1280 "La Gran AW" (oldies)
 XHFMTU-FM 103.7 FMTU (Top 40)
 XHLUPE-FM 105.3 "La Lupe" (Spanish adult hits)
 XHITS-FM 106.1 "Hits FM" (pop)
 XHPJ-FM 106.9 "Classic 106.9" (English AC)

Outside of Monterrey

Baja California 
 XHHC-FM 92.1 Ensenada
 XHPENS-FM 94.7 Ensenada
 XHHIT-FM 95.3 Tijuana

Chihuahua 
 XHCTC-FM 99.9 Ciudad Cuauhtémoc
 XHPCCC-FM 103.3 Ciudad Cuauhtémoc 
 XEJUA-AM 640 Ciudad Juárez
 XHAHC-FM 90.9 Chihuahua
 XHCHH-FM 94.9 Chihuahua
 XHHEM-FM 103.7 Chihuahua
 XHCHA-FM 104.5 Chihuahua
 XHHPR-FM 101.7 Hidalgo del Parral

Coahuila 
 XHTRR-FM 92.3 Torreón
 XHCTO-FM 93.1 Torreón
 XHWN-FM 93.9 Torreón
 XHETOR-FM 99.9 Torreón
 XHRCA-FM 102.7 Torreón
 XHQC-FM 93.5 Saltillo
 XHCLO-FM 107.1 Monclova

Durango 
 XHRPU-FM 102.9 Durango

Guanajuato 
 XHPEBJ-FM 96.7 León

Jalisco 
 XHKB-FM 99.9 Guadalajara

Nayarit 
 XHPCTN-FM 88.3 Tepic
 XHXT-FM 105.7 Tepic

Nuevo León 
 XHLN-FM 104.9 Linares
 XHR-FM 105.7 Linares

Oaxaca 
 XHAXA-FM 88.9 Oaxaca

San Luis Potosí 
 XHSNP-FM 97.7 San Luis Potosí
 XHCZ-FM 104.9 San Luis Potosí

Sinaloa 
 XHCCCC-FM 90.7 Culiacán
 XHPMAZ-FM 92.1 Mazatlán

Tamaulipas 
 XHLRS-FM 95.3 Ciudad Victoria/Linares, NL
 XHVTH-FM 107.1 Matamoros
 XHGNK-FM 96.7 Nuevo Laredo
 XHNLO-FM 97.1 Nuevo Laredo
 XHRYS-FM 90.1 Reynosa
 XHAAA-FM 93.1 Reynosa
 XHFW-FM 88.5 / XEFW-AM 810 Tampico
 XHTPO-FM 94.5 Tampico
 XHTW-FM 94.9 Tampico
 XHON-FM 96.1 Tampico

Veracruz 
 XHFTI-FM 89.5 Fortín de las Flores
 XHPUGC-FM 96.3 Úrsulo Galván-Cardel
 XHPALV-FM 100.9 Alto Lucero-Xalapa

Yucatán 
 XHCCCT-FM 94.1 Mérida

International 
Multimedios owns one station outside of Mexico, Top Radio 97.2 in Madrid.

See also 
 Grupo Multimedios

References

External links 
 

 
Grupo Multimedios
Mexican radio networks